Serial Teachers (French title: Les Profs) is a 2013 French comedy film directed by  Pierre-François Martin-Laval. The film is based on the comics Les Profs by Pica and Erroc. It was the top-grossing French film of the year, with a total of 3,957,176 admissions in France.

A sequel, Serial Teachers 2, was released on 1 July 2015.

Cast 
 Christian Clavier as Serge Cutiro
 Isabelle Nanty as Gladys
 Pierre-François Martin-Laval as Antoine Polochon
 Kev Adams as Thierry Boulard
 Arnaud Ducret as Éric
 Stéfi Celma as Amina
 Raymond Bouchard as Maurice
 Fred Tousch as Albert
 Alice David as Marie
 François Morel as the academy deputy inspector
 Dominique Pinon as the academy inspector
 Philippe Duclos as the headmaster
 Éric Naggar as Paul
 Yves Pignot as Monsieur Miranda
 Marie-Laure Descoureaux as Dolorès
 Nicolas Beaucaire as Monsieur Blondeau
 Jean-Louis Barcelona as Marcellin Jacquard
 Fabienne Chaudat as The academy secretary
 Claire Chazal as a television journalist

References

External links 
 

2013 films
2013 comedy films
2010s French-language films
French comedy films
Films based on French comics
Live-action films based on comics
Films about education
Films directed by Pierre-François Martin-Laval
2010s French films